Thug Matrix 2 is a compilation album released by the hip-hop artist Tragedy Khadafi, including some previously released songs.

2006 albums
Tragedy Khadafi albums